= KLFI =

KLFI may refer to:

- KLFI-LP, a low-power television station (channel 35) licensed to Texarkana, Arkansas, United States
- the ICAO code for Langley Air Force Base
